Linguloidea is a superfamily of brachiopods.

References

Lingulata
Animal superfamilies